Kenny Deori Basumatary is an Indian actor and film director in Assamese films. He is best known for Directing the Assamese martial arts  comedy film Local Kung Fu he also starred in the movie. It was nominated for best Assamese film in the inaugural Filmfare awards for the Eastern region. The budget for this film was Rs.95,000.

Early life
Kenny dropped out of college while pursuing Computer Engineering in IIT Delhi. After that, he worked as a newsreader for an Assamese News channel.

Film career
In 2009, Kenny moved to Mumbai to attend film scripting workshop, in which his martial arts based script did not make it to top six. He then went on to act in commercials, TV serials and small roles in Shanghai, Phata Poster Nikla Hero and Mary Kom. Besides acting, he wrote a book, Chocolate Guitar Momos, published in 2011.

He moved back to Guwahati and with the help of family, directed Local Kung Fu in a budget of nearly 1500 US Dollars.

Filmography

Actor
Local Kung Fu (2013) as Charlie
Raag (2014) as Alok
Mary Kom(2014) as Jimmy
Luv Ka The End
Local Kung Fu 2 (2017) as Deep / Deepu
Raagdesh (2017) as Netaji Subhas Chandra Bose
Kammara Sambhavam(2018)
Suspended Inspector Boro (2018)
Bornodi Bhotiai (2019)
Yaara (2020) as Bahadur
Local Utpaat

Director
Local Kung Fu (2013)
Local Kung Fu 2 (2017)
Suspended Inspector Boro (2018)
 Tomar Opekhyat (Web series) (2021)
 Local Utpaat (2022)

References

External links 
 

Assamese actors
Indian male film actors
Film directors from Assam
Assamese-language film directors
Living people
Male actors from Guwahati
Year of birth missing (living people)